Pershina is a rural locality (a village) in Beloyevskoye Rural Settlement, Kudymkarsky District, Perm Krai, Russia. The population was 38 as of 2010.

Geography 
Pershina is located 27 km northwest of Kudymkar (the district's administrative centre) by road. Yevsina is the nearest rural locality.

References 

Rural localities in Kudymkarsky District